New York Reunion is a 1991 album by McCoy Tyner released on the Chesky label. It was recorded in April 1991 and features performances by Tyner with tenor saxophonist Joe Henderson, bassist  Ron Carter and drummer Al Foster. The AllMusic review by Scott Yanow states that "The advanced hard bop music is as rewarding as one would expect".

Track listing 

 "Recorda Me" (Henderson) - 9:47
 "Miss Bea (Dedicated to Mother)" (Tyner) - 7:09
 "What Is This Thing Called Love?" (Porter) - 8:03
 "My Romance" (Hart, Rodgers) - 6:37
 "Ask Me Now" (Monk) - 12:11
 "Beautiful Love" (Gillespie, King, Van Alstyne, Young) - 9:13
 "A Quick Sketch" (Carter) - 10:36
 "Home" (Tyner) - 10:58

Personnel 

 McCoy Tyner - piano
 Joe Henderson - tenor saxophone
 Ron Carter - bass
 Al Foster - drums

References 

McCoy Tyner albums
1991 albums
Chesky Records albums